Muévelo may refer to:

 "Muévelo" (Nicky Jam and Daddy Yankee song), 2020
 "Muévelo" (Sofía Reyes song), featuring Wisin, 2014
 "Muévelo", a 2007 song by Cruz Martínez y Los Super Reyes from El Regreso de los Reyes
 "Muévelo", a 1996 song by Fey from Tierna la Noche